Nottinghamshire North and Chesterfield was a European Parliament constituency covering parts of Derbyshire and Nottinghamshire in England.

Prior to its uniform adoption of proportional representation in 1999, the United Kingdom used first-past-the-post for the European elections in England, Scotland and Wales. The European Parliament constituencies used under that system were smaller than the later regional constituencies and only had one Member of the European Parliament each.

The constituency was created in 1994 from parts of Sheffield,  Derbyshire, Lincolnshire and Nottingham, and consisted of the Westminster Parliament constituencies of Bassetlaw, Bolsover, Chesterfield, Mansfield, Newark, North East Derbyshire and Sherwood.

Members of the European Parliament

Results

References

External links
 David Boothroyd's United Kingdom Election Results

European Parliament constituencies in England (1979–1999)
Politics of Nottinghamshire
Politics of Derbyshire
1994 establishments in England
1999 disestablishments in England
Constituencies established in 1994
Constituencies disestablished in 1999